Prior to 1865, the Governor of South Carolina was chosen by the General Assembly. The Constitution of South Carolina provided for the voters of South Carolina to choose the governor; James Lawrence Orr was the first elected governor of South Carolina. The following is a list of gubernatorial election results for the state of South Carolina:

Results

Statistics

Firsts
The gubernatorial election of 1865 was the first gubernatorial election of South Carolina.
The gubernatorial election of 1896 was the first gubernatorial election that featured the use of a primary election.
The gubernatorial election of 1898 was the first gubernatorial election that featured the use of a runoff election.

Votes
There have been 51 gubernatorial elections in South Carolina.
Democrats have won 40 of the 47 (85%) elections that they nominated a candidate.
Republicans have won 10 of the 18 (56%) elections that they nominated a candidate.
James Lawrence Orr won with the smallest margin of victory in the gubernatorial election of 1865: 743.
The gubernatorial election of 1926 had the lowest vote: 16,589.
The gubernatorial election of 2018 had the largest vote: 1,705,506.

Unique politicians
Only three governors have been defeated for reelection: Daniel Henry Chamberlain in 1876, David Beasley in 1998 and Jim Hodges in 2002.
Coleman Livingston Blease has made the most attempts for governor (8): 1906, 1908, 1910, 1912, 1916, 1922, 1934 and 1938. He was successful in 1910 and 1912.

See also
Governor of South Carolina
List of governors of South Carolina

External links 
 SCIway List of South Carolina Governors in Chronological Order

 
Elections
Quadrennial elections